Henry James Tollemache (1846 – 2 April 1939) was a British Conservative Party politician. He served as the Member of Parliament successively for West Cheshire (1881–1885) and Eddisbury (1885–1906).

He was the third child and eldest son of Wilbraham Spencer Tollemache and Anne Tomkinson of Dorfold Hall, Acton, in Cheshire. His father was the younger son of Admiral John Richard Delap Halliday (who assumed the surname and arms of Tollemache in 1821) and the brother of John Tollemache, 1st Baron Tollemache. Henry Tollemache married Katharine Mary Frances Streatfeild in 1904; his wife died in 1916. The couple had no surviving children, and Dorfold Hall passed to his nephew, Christopher F. Roundell, the son of his eldest sister, Julia (1845–1931).

A painting of Tollemache and his sister Julia by "Hurleston" (possibly Frederick Yeates Hurlstone) hangs in the Dining Room of Dorfold Hall. He played cricket for Nantwich Cricket Club with A. N. Hornby.

References

Sources

External links 
 

1846 births
1939 deaths
Conservative Party (UK) MPs for English constituencies
UK MPs 1880–1885
UK MPs 1885–1886
UK MPs 1886–1892
UK MPs 1892–1895
UK MPs 1895–1900
UK MPs 1900–1906
Henry James Tollemache